Dark Bahama is a 1950 thriller novel by the British writer Peter Cheyney. It was the second in a trilogy featuring the private detective  Johnny Vallon, a hard-drinking former army officer. The story also features Quale, the head of British intelligence who appears on several other novels by Cheyney. Much of the action takes place in a fictional island in the Bahamas and nearby Miami in Florida.

Synopsis
Johnny Vallon, head of Chennault Investigations, sends out one of his men to the West Indies to bring back a headstrong daughter of a wealthy family. However, things soon to be much more complex and treacherous as they first appear.

References

Bibliography
 James, Russell. Great British Fictional Detectives. Remember When, 21 Apr 2009.
 Panek, LeRoy. The Special Branch: The British Spy Novel, 1890-1980. Popular Press, 1981.
 Reilly, John M. Twentieth Century Crime & Mystery Writers. Springer, 2015.

1950 British novels
Novels by Peter Cheyney
British thriller novels
Novels set in the Bahamas
Novels set in London
Novels set in Miami
William Collins, Sons books